The World Customs Organization (WCO) is an intergovernmental organization headquartered in Brussels, Belgium. The WCO works on customs-related matters including the development of international conventions, instruments, and tools on topics such as commodity classification, valuation, rules of origin, collection of customs revenue, supply chain security, international trade facilitation, customs enforcement activities, combating counterfeiting in support of Intellectual Property Rights (IPR), illegal drug enforcement, combating counterfeiting of medicinal drugs, illegal weapons trading, integrity promotion, and delivering sustainable capacity building to assist with customs reforms and modernization. The WCO maintains the international Harmonized System (HS) goods nomenclature, and administers the technical aspects of the World Trade Organization (WTO) Agreements on Customs Valuation and Rules of Origin.

History
On August 23, 1947, the Committee for European Economic Cooperation created a European Customs Union Study Group (ECUSG) to examine economic and technical issues of inter-European Customs Union concerning the rules of the General Agreement on Tariffs and Trade (GATT). In total, six ECUSG meetings were held in four years from November 1947 to June 1950. This work of ECUSG led to the adoption in 1950 of the Convention establishing the Customs Co-operation Council (CCC), which was signed in Brussels. On January 26, 1953, the CCC's inaugural session took place with the participation of 17 founding members. CCC membership subsequently expanded to cover all regions of the globe.  In 1994, the organization adopted its current name, the World Customs Organization. Today, WCO members are responsible for customs controls in 184 countries representing more than 98 percent of all international trade.

Vision and objectives
The WCO is internationally acknowledged as the global centre of customs expertise and plays a leading role in the discussion, development, promotion and implementation of modern customs systems and procedures. It is responsive to the needs of its members and its strategic environment, and its instruments and best-practice approaches are recognized as the basis for sound customs administration throughout the world.

The WCO's primary objective is to enhance the efficiency effectiveness other members customs administrations, thereby assisting them to contribute successfully to national development goals, particularly revenue collection, national security, trade facilitation, community protection, and collection of trade statistics.

Instruments
In order to achieve its objectives, the WCO has adopted a number of customs instruments, including but not limited to the following:

Online tools 
The World Customs Organization (WCO) released a new online platform, WCO Trade Tools, that encompasses the Harmonized System, preferential Rules of Origin and Valuation. It includes the 2002, 2007, 2012, 2017 and 2022 editions of the HS, around 400 Free Trade Agreements with their preferential Rules of Origin/ and Product Specific rules, and the set list of Valuation texts, including those of the Technical Committee on Customs Valuation.

Administration
The WCO Secretariat is headed by a Secretary General, who is elected by the WCO membership to a five-year term. Kunio Mikuriya from Japan was first elected WCO Secretary General on 1 January 2009, and continued in this post .  
The WCO is governed by the council, which brings together all members of the organization once a year, in a meeting chaired by an elected chairperson. Additional strategic and management guidance is provided by the Policy and Finance committees.
There are several other WCO committees, including the Harmonized System Committee, the Permanent Technical Committee, the Technical Committee on Customs Valuation, Technical Committee on Rules of Origin, the Capacity Building Committee, and the SAFE Working Group.

References

External links

B. Kormych The European Customs Union Study Group: Drafting the EU Customs Legislation
WCO Trade Tools

 
Organizations established in 1952
1952 establishments in Belgium
International organisations based in Belgium
Customs duties
United Nations General Assembly observers
Intergovernmental organizations established by treaty